Robert Don McLeod (November 10, 1938 – July 6, 2019) was a former professional American football player. A 6'5", 232 lbs. tight end from Abilene Christian University, McLeod was drafted by the American Football League (AFL)'s Houston Oilers in 1961. McLeod played 6 seasons in professional football, from 1961 to 1966.

References

1938 births
Living people
People from Sweetwater, Texas
Players of American football from Texas
American football tight ends
Abilene Christian Wildcats football players
Houston Oilers players
American Football League All-Star players
American Football League players